{{DISPLAYTITLE:C8H15N3}}
The molecular formula C8H15N3 (molar mass: 153.225 g/mol) may refer to:

 Impentamine
 7-Methyl-1,5,7-triazabicyclo[4.4.0]dec-5-ene

Molecular formulas